The FSC Lublin was a light commercial van produced by the Polish automaker FSC in Lublin. Production started in 1993, and was intended to replace the aging Żuk, which was finally discontinued in 1998.

The van, known as Lublin 33 was produced until 1995, when Daewoo Motors took control of FSC and renamed it as Lublin II. In 1999 the Lublin III was put into production. After the Daewoo Group bankruptcy, the future of the Lublin brand looked bleak.

In 2001 the brand Lublin was sold to a British company, Truck Alliance. Later the brand was owned by Intrall Polska, a Russo-British company, and the van was sold under the name Intrall Lublin. Later the rights to the model were acquired by DZT Tymińscy, which manufactured a small batch of them under Pasagon with the modernized frame and slight changes to the front of the vehicle, made to accommodate a larger engine meeting Euro 5 standards. Later they tried to sell it again under the name of Honker Cargo but with no success.

During the later 2000s, Daewoo Motors would enter a joint venture with LDV Limited to develop a new commercial vehicle that would replace both the Lublin II and the old LDV Convoy range, however following GM's acquisition of Daewoo, LDV secured the exclusive rights to the vehicle, purchased the tooling, and moved it from Daewoo's plant in Lublin, Poland to the LDV site in Washwood Heath, Birmingham. The vehicle was eventually launched as the LDV Maxus in 2004.

Gallery

References

External links 

 Intrall Polska (Lublin)

Cars of Poland
Lublin van
Science and technology in Poland